Piper Pass is a mountain pass in the United States Range, Nunavut, Canada.

References 

Arctic Cordillera
Mountain passes of Qikiqtaaluk Region